Events in the year 2010 in Turkey.

Incumbents
President: Abdullah Gül 
Prime Minister: Recep Tayyip Erdoğan

Events
 8 March – The 6.1  Elazığ earthquake shook eastern Turkey with a maximum Mercalli intensity of VI (Strong). Forty-two people were killed.
 28 August – 2010 FIBA World Championship
 2 December – Women's World Chess Championship 2010

Deaths

18 June – Okan Demiriş.
Leyla Gamsiz Sarptürk.

See also
List of Turkish films of 2010

References

 
Years of the 21st century in Turkey
2010s in Turkey
Turkey
Turkey
Turkey